Memorial High School (MHS) is a secondary school located at 935 Echo Lane in Hedwig Village, Texas, United States, in Greater Houston.

Memorial serves students in portions of the Memorial and Spring Branch regions of Houston and several enclaves within the portions. Memorial is part of the Spring Branch Independent School District (SBISD) and serves grades 9 through 12. As of 2005, the district was granted a $500 million education grant, $150 million of which belongs to Memorial High School.

History

Memorial Senior High School opened in 1962 to relieve overcrowding at Spring Branch High School. Memorial was the second high school to open in SBISD. At the time, students living north of Old Katy Road attended Spring Branch and students living south of Old Katy Road attended Memorial. This arrangement lasted until Spring Woods High School opened in 1964.

The design of the school was classic early 1960s in the South, with a large, open campus. Each classroom building opened into an outside breezeway, to maximize air flow as the school did not have air conditioning.

When Memorial first opened, the area surrounding the school was largely forest and rice fields, but it rapidly grew as new subdivisions were built, and by the mid-1960s, Memorial's enrollment exceeded 3,000 students, a number much larger than the school was meant to hold. This problem was resolved with the opening of Westchester Senior High School in 1967, and later Stratford Senior High School in 1974.

At the time, Memorial's main rivals were the Spring Branch Bears and Westchester Wildcats. However, by the mid-1980s, the enrollment of nearly every school across the district had dropped precariously, and it was decided that Westchester and Spring Branch High Schools would be closed. Memorial remained open, and took in students from both Westchester and Spring Branch High Schools.

Today, Memorial is the oldest high school still operating in Spring Branch ISD. The school has received extensive renovations, which began during the 1996–1997 school year. Every building in the school was gutted and refurbished, outdated facilities were replaced and the campus was made more secure.

In 2011, Memorial High School was named the #10 most posh public school in the country, as it pulls from a very wealthy area of Houston.

In January 2017 a vandal sprayed graffiti of a racist character on the school property.

Campus

The campus is two blocks south of Interstate 10. Memorial City Mall is to the west.

Neighborhoods served
Memorial serves students in all of the Memorial Villages (including Bunker Hill Village, Hedwig Village, Hilshire Village, Spring Valley Village, and most of Hunters Creek Village and Piney Point Village). While the school has a Houston address, it is located in the city of Hedwig Village, and it draws from a small portion of Houston in the Memorial and Spring Branch regions (including Stablewood, Afton Village, Brykerwoods, Monarch Oaks, Spring Oaks, Sandalwood, Whispering Oaks, and portions of Westview Terrace). A section of the Memorial City district is within the school's attendance zone.
Memorial High School has eleven lunch vendors that deliver meals to students on campus during their respective lunch periods.

Athletics

Memorial has a rivalry with Stratford High School.

Memorial also has a formerly successful football team, which went to the state semifinals in December 2010 in the Division II bracket. The 1979 Mustangs went all the way to the state finals, a school record as of yet unbeaten.

As of 2012, the Memorial tennis team had a district record of 73-0 and has finished in the state finals for 2010, 2011, and 2012. As of 2019 for Memorial has participated in 11 back to back trips to the UIL Team Tennis State Tournament. Of these tennis tournaments Memorial has won the state championship twice.

Memorial has a men's basketball team that has had some success historically although it has not seen success in recent years. Under the school's original basketball coach, Don Coleman, they were able to win a state title in 1966. Memorial also has a girls' basketball team.

Memorial has both a boys' and girls' soccer team. The girls' team has had much success, most recently winning a state championship title in 2018.

Memorial also has track & field, cross country, swimming/diving, golf, baseball, softball, and volleyball teams. The school also has a club field hockey team for girls, and club lacrosse and rugby for both boys and girls.

Demographic information
As of 2019 according to STAAR data
 Total number of enrolled students: 2620
 Racial/Ethnic group:
 Asian/Pacific Islander 16.25%
 Hispanic/Latino 19.50%
 Black 2.06%
 White 59.06%
 Native American 0.15%
 Two or more races 2.98%
 Sex of Teachers:
 Female Teachers 58.76%
 Males Teachers 41.31%

Awards and honors
Memorial was named a 1988-89 National Blue Ribbon School.

The school was ranked 258th, 133rd, 103rd, 126th, 225th, 307th, and 254th in Newsweeks 2003, 2005, 2006, 2007, 2010, 2012, and 2013 lists, respectively, of top high schools in the United States since the list's inception in 2003. It was also ranked 239th and 233rd in U.S. News 2012 and 2013 lists, respectively, of top high schools in the United States.

Memorial was given the College Readiness Award by the Texas ACT Council in 2008 and 2010. The school was awarded the Just 4 The Kids (NCEA) High Performing School award in 2008 and 2009. In 2008, it was named an Honor Roll School by the Texas Business & Education Coalition. Memorial was named one of the Top 10 Best High Schools in the Area by Children at Risk in 2008, 2009, 2011, and 2012. It was also given the TAKS Gold Performance Award in 2012.

The school achieved "recognized" status in the accountability ratings system by the Texas Education Agency in 2000, 2001, 2002, 2004, 2005, 2008, 2009, 2010, and 2011.

It was awarded five stars and ranked in the top ten high schools in Texas by Texas Monthly magazine in 2002.

Feeder patterns

Feeding from public schools
Elementary schools that feed into Memorial High School include:
 Bunker Hill
 Frostwood
 Hunters Creek
 Memorial Drive
 Valley Oaks
 Housman (partial)
 Rummel Creek (partial)

Middle schools that feed into Memorial High School include:
 H. M. Landrum (partial)
 Memorial Middle School (partial)
 Spring Branch Middle School (partial)

Feeding from private schools
Some private schools, such as First Baptist Academy, Grace School, Presbyterian School, River Oaks Baptist School, St. Francis Episcopal Day School, and The Regis School of the Sacred Heart, have students that matriculate into Memorial.

Notable alumni
 Michael Dell — founder and CEO of Dell, Inc
Jeffery Hildebrand—Founder Hilcorp Energy Company
Michael Simms — publisher, founder of Autumn House Press
 David Fahrenthold — 2017 Pulitzer Prize-winning journalist and author
Jennifer Williams — Diplomat
Steve Munisteri — chairman of the Republican Party of Texas from 2010 to 2016.
 Alex Kim — State Judge, 323rd District Court of Tarrant County, Texas
 Bill Baumann — former San Antonio attorney
Cory Morrow — country singer and songwriter
Walker Lukens — singer-songwriter
Alan Sneider — eSports personality 
 Otto Wood — drummer of Waterparks (band)
 Doug Dawson — former NFL Offensive Lineman
 Gene Chilton — former NFL Offensive Lineman
 Kiki DeAyala — former NFL Linebacker
 Graham Godfrey — Former Major League Baseball Pitcher
 Chrisian Roa — Pitcher in Minor League Baseball
 Wayne Taylor — former Catcher and Left Fielder in Minor League Baseball
 Kacy Clemens — former First Baseman in Minor League Baseball, and son of Roger Clemens
 Kody Clemens — former Second Baseman in Minor League Baseball, and son of Roger Clemens
 Koby Clemens — former Catcher, First Baseman, and Third Baseman, and son of Roger Clemens

Controversies

2017 Graffiti 
Memorial was shocked in January 2017 when vandals broke into the school over winter break and vandalized the campus with racist graffiti. The vandalism included a crudely drawn swastika, multiple uses of the n-word, pentagrams, the phrase "white power," sexually explicit phrases and offensive symbols. The Anti-Defamation League would take notice of this event and comment on it, bringing notoriety to the event.

Thug Day 
Memorial would face controversy in May 2019 over a spirit week tradition of "Thug Day' which was tweeted out by an upset student and went viral. Critics would claim that the event was racially insensitive to African-Americans and was an example of cultural appropriation due to the utilization of basketball jerseys, cornrows, do-rags, gang signs, and fake tattoos. Critics would range from media organizations and alumni to the local chapter of the NAACP. Memorial High would go on to cancel the 'spirit week' over the racist undertones of 'thug day' which the school claimed was an unofficial extension of the spirit week's 'jersey day.' Students went on to claim that campus tension increased as a result of the fallout, alongside mixed reception from alumni.

Notes

References

External links

Memorial High School
Memorial High School Baseball official site
Memorial High School Theatre
Memorial High School Mustang Band
MHS Orchestra
Memorial Mustang Outreach Bunch
Spring Branch ISD News

Spring Branch Independent School District high schools
Public education in Houston
Educational institutions established in 1962
1962 establishments in Texas